Globularia bisnagarica, the common ball flower, is a species of plants belonging to the family Plantaginaceae.

Description
It is a perennial plant with bright blue spherical flowerheads and dark green, leathery, spathulate leaves, veined beneath. The flowering period extends from March to June.

Distribution
This species can be found in Central and Southern Europe.

References

bisnagarica